Good Life Recordings is a Belgian independent record label which was founded in 1996 by Edward Verhaeghe, who had been the lead vocalist of Nations on Fire. The label specializes in hardcore punk bands. It has released albums by the majority of the signed bands that are part of H8000. Between 2000 and 2003 Good Life made a deal with Trustkill Records to release limited picture discs and compilations of some of its bands.

Artists

Current roster
 A Traitor Like Judas	
 Angel Crew
 As We Fight
 Congress	
 Damien Done
 Death Before Disco
 Doomsday
 Endzweck
 Lost in Rhone
 Nasty
 No Second Chance
 Renounced
 Shelter
 State Craft

Past roster
 100 Demons
 25 Ta Life
 Abnegation
 Aftershock
 Arkangel
 As Friends Rust
 Avenged Sevenfold
 Birthright
 Breach
 Broken Promises
 Brothers Keeper
 Catafalque
 Comin' Correct
 Course of Action
 Culture
 Day of Contempt
 Dead Blue Sky
 Deformity
 Disciple
 Disembodied
 Driven
 Dying Fetus
 Eighteen Visions
 For the Living
 Grey Goose
 Hamartia
 Integrity
 In-Quest
 Kindred
 Length of Time
 Liar
 Morning Again
 Most Precious Blood
 Naiad
 Negate
 Nora
 One King Down
 Poison the Well
 Racetraitor
 Racial Abuse
 Regression
 Reprisal
 Reveal
 Sense Field
 Sentence
 Shai Hulud
 Shockwave
 Shorebreak
 Shortsight
 Skycamefalling
 Slamcoke
 Spirit of Youth
 Spirit 84
 Sportswear
 Spread The Disease
 The Last Year
 Torn Apart
 Trapped in Life
 Undying
 Waking Kills the Dream

External links
 

Heavy metal record labels
Hardcore record labels
Record labels established in 1996
Good Life Recordings